Supergiant Games, LLC is an American independent video game developer and publisher based in San Francisco. It was founded in 2009 by Amir Rao and Gavin Simon, and is known for the critically acclaimed games Bastion, Transistor, Pyre and Hades.

History

Supergiant Games was formed by Amir Rao and Gavin Simon in 2009. Both had been working at the Los Angeles studio of Electronic Arts, involved with the Command & Conquer series. In 2009 they agreed to quit their job, move into the same house, and begin to work on a new game together. Artist Jen Zee became the studio's third member, and, later, its art director. Musician Darren Korb was hired for audio and music work. They used a number of freelancer programmers and developers they could call on for help at various times during the development of this first game.

Their first game, Bastion, received high critical praise, including being listed among several "Game of the Year" lists from game journalists. It was first shown in mid-development at the 2010 Penny Arcade Expo as part of its "PAX 10" highlight ten upcoming independently developed games. This attracted several publishers who wanted to help distribute the game; Supergiant Games chose Warner Bros. Interactive Entertainment, leading to the game's distribution on Xbox Live Arcade and also as a premiere title during the 2011 "Summer of Arcade" promotion.

In March 2013, Supergiant Games announced their next title, Transistor, released on May 20, 2014. A promotion video was released on March 19. The game features a female protagonist, Red, in a cyberpunk-like city, who has acquired a powerful weapon that she is nearly killed for possessing. The game features a similar isometric viewpoint to Bastion and also met with critical acclaim.

In April 2016, Supergiant Games announced their third game, Pyre, released on July 25, 2017, for Microsoft Windows, Linux and PlayStation 4. It was described as a party-based role-playing game. In a break from their previous games, Pyre does not use an isometric viewpoint; the player's party travels across a 2D overworld, and combat takes place on a separate arena. The combat system is also very different, being described as "fantasy basketball". Pyre was again regarded fondly by critics and was named Game Informer best indie RPG for that year.

Supergiant's next game, Hades, was revealed at The Game Awards 2018 and released on September 17, 2020, following an early access release from December 2018. Hades is an action roguelike game based on Greek mythology, where the player character Zagreus uses a combination of weapons, magic, and abilities to defeat enemies in procedurally-generated dungeons and escape from his father, Hades. Hades was met with critical acclaim, selling over 1 million copies and reaching "universal acclaim" status on Metacritic; with several awards won. It was nominated for nine awards at The Game Awards 2020, including for game of the year. Hades would end up winning two awards for best Independent Game and Best Action. Hades also won the best game award at the 2020 BAFTA Games Awards, the 2020 D.I.C.E. Awards, and the 2020 Game Developers Choice Awards

At The Game Awards 2022, Supergiant announced Hades II. Like the original Hades, it will be a roguelike game based on Greek mythology and it will be developed in early access.

Games developed

References

External links 
 

2009 establishments in California
American companies established in 2009
Companies based in San Francisco
Video game companies established in 2009
Video game companies of the United States
Privately held companies based in California
Indie video game developers